Forensic profiling is the study of trace evidence in order to develop information which can be used by police authorities. This information can be used to identify suspects and convict them in a court of law.

The term "forensic" in this context refers to "information that is used in court as evidence" . The traces originate from criminal or litigious activities themselves. However traces are information that is not strictly dedicated to the court. They may increase knowledge in broader domains linked to security that deal with investigation, intelligence, surveillance, or risk analysis . 

Forensic profiling is different from offender profiling, which only refers to the identification of an offender to the psychological profile of a criminal.

In particular, forensic profiling should refer to profiling in the information sciences sense, i.e., to "The process of 'discovering' correlations between data in data bases that can be used to identify and represent a human or nonhuman subject (individual or group), and/or the application of profiles (sets of correlated data) to individuate and represent a subject or to identify a subject as a member of a group or category"  .

Profiling techniques 

Forensic profiling is generally conducted using datamining technology, as a means by which relevant patterns are discovered, and profiles are generated from large quantities of data.

A distinction of forms of profiles that are used in a given context is necessary before evaluating applications of data mining techniques for forensic profiling.

Data available 

The data available to law enforcement agencies are divided into two categories :
 Nominal data directly designates persons or objects (recidivists, intelligence files and suspect files, stolen vehicles or objects, etc.) and their relations. Nominal data may also be obtained in the framework of specific investigations, for instance a list of calls made with a mobile phone (card and/or phone) that cover a certain period of time, a list of people corresponding to a certain profile, or data obtained through surveillances;
 Crime data consist of traces that result from criminal activities: physical traces, other information collected at the scene, from witness or victims or some electronic traces, as well as reconstructed descriptions of cases (modus operandi, time intervals, duration and place) and their relations (links between cases, series).

Types 

 DNA profiling  Used for the identification of individuals on the basis of their respective DNA profiles.
 Digital Image Forensics. This covers: image source identification (which is based on specific characteristics of the image acquisition device or technology) and malicious post-processing or tampering (which aim is for instance to verify the integrity of particular features) .
 Illicit drug profiling, which refers to the systematic extraction and storage of chemical attributes of drugs seized in order to obtain indications on the manufacture and distribution processes, the size and the evolution of the market). 
 Forensic Information Technology (forensic IT), which refers to the analysis of the digital traces that people leave when using information technology.
 Offender profiling i.e. psychological profiling of the criminal.

Issues 
The use of profiling techniques represents threats to the privacy of the individual and to the protection of fundamental freedoms. Indeed, criminal data, i.e., data which are collected and processed for suppressing criminal offences, often consists of personal data. One of the issues is the re-use of personal data collected within one criminal investigation for another purpose than the one for which it was collected. An example from the book, “The Psychology and Sociology of Wrongful Convictions: Forensic Science Reform,” there was a profiling error, in which this woman was raped and slaughtered by a serial killer. The suspect was named the Boston Strangler and investigators worked hard in trying to gather a profile for this criminal. Experts eventually came up with the Boston Strangler being two people and that both men lived alone, most likely schoolteachers, and one of them was homosexual. The criminal finally confessed to the crime and his DNA matched up with the scene, but his profile didn’t fit the crime. The profile the experts came up with didn’t match any characteristics of the killer (pp.6). Creating profiles just creates tunnel vision because investigators will be focusing on finding a specific individual that the profile fits, when in reality, the profiling system is insanely flawed and is considered useless to the investigators.

Several methods-including technical, legal, and behavioral-are available to address some of the issues associated with forensic profiling. For instance, in Europe the European Convention on Human Rights provides a number of instruments for the Protection of Individuals with regard to Automatic Processing of Personal Data.

See also 

 Forensic identification
 Profiling (disambiguation)
 Use of social network websites in investigations

References

Offender profiling
Profiling